The 1984 Miami Redskins football team was an American football team that represented Miami University in the Mid-American Conference (MAC) during the 1984 NCAA Division I-A football season. In its second season under head coach Tim Rose, the team compiled a 4–7 record (3–5 against MAC opponents), finished in a tie for sixth place in the MAC, and were outscored by all opponents by a combined total of 221 to 175.

The team's statistical leaders included Todd Rollins with 951 passing yards, George Swarn with 1,282 rushing yards, and Tom Murphy with 492 receiving yards.

Schedule

Roster

References

Miami
Miami RedHawks football seasons
Miami Redskins football